Marbury Hall may refer to:

 Marbury Hall, Anderton with Marbury, Cheshire;
  Marbury Hall, Marbury cum Quoisley
  Marbury Hall, a locomotive

Architectural disambiguation pages